Stefania Noelle Barr (born December 4, 1994) is an American actress, singer, songwriter, composer, and lead vocalist of indie-alternative rock band Shrink the Giant. She is perhaps best known for her role as Maysilee Donner in The Hunger Games: Second Quarter Quell.

Performance career

Barr started her acting career in 2003 (age 8) with Disney Channel Original Movie Right on Track.

She was praised for her work ethic and maturity on set. Producer Jason Nacey of The Doorstep stated that she “stuck out like a sore thumb”, among other actors her age, after booking the lead role as a walk-in on the final round of auditions. Her roles in 2005's The Doorstep, 2006's Unrest and 2007's The Last Sin Eater and The Dance established her as a serious, mature-beyond-her-years actress.

She started her first indie-alternative rock band in early 2010 (age 14) (called Metanoia) with two high school friends. Barr sang lead vocals and played lead guitar, with Alyssa Kennington as backup vocals and rhythm guitar, and Thomas Flinders on drums. The trio played local venues together, including the Deer Valley Concert Series of Park City, Utah. After a few short months, they disbanded.

Under the direction of manager/producer Jean-Marc Barr, Barr joined with Aaron Hurt to form Shrink the Giant in the fall of 2010. They immediately began recording an album.

Barr's fame was established in 2011 by playing Maysilee Donner in The Hunger Games: Second Quarter Quell. Fans around the world immediately accepted and embraced her as the face of Maysilee, and a part of The Hunger Games "fandom."

Shrink the Giant released their first album worldwide on May 15, 2012. The album received great reviews from press and fans alike. SLUG Magazine heralded it as "polished and ready for the masses."

Barr was cast in 2012's Life According to Penny

As a composer, Stefania completed her first musical score in December, 2012 for the film Life According To Penny, in which she also starred as the lead character "Penny." Post-production on the short was completed January, 2012, and it is currently touring festivals across the country. After just one film festival screening, Stefania was nominated for the Best Original Score (which she won) and Best Lead Actress, in the Filmed in Utah Awards. The film itself won Best Short Film and the People's Choice Award, and will likely be made into a feature-length film within the next few years. She was also nominated for Best Original Score in the Filmbreak awards, in May 2012.

Through her online work with Mainstay (including another short film she was featured in for the book Unwind by Neal Shusterman), HarperCollins asked specifically for Stefania to act in a book trailer for Kat Zhang's recently released novel What's Left of Me. The trailer was featured exclusively on Entertainment Weekly upon its release, and is now available on HarperTeen's YouTube channel.

Since the release of their album, Shrink the Giant turned their attention to playing shows. Barr and bandmate Aaron recruited a local drummer (Alex Larsen), bassist (Marisa Wilde), and Stefania's brother (Sebastian Barr, a violinist and percussionist) to fill in the parts they recorded on the album. The full performance band began playing local venues together on August 1, 2012.

In September 2012, they submitted one of their songs to a Salt Lake City radio station, X96, in the "Put Your Band Where Our Bash Is" competition. They were chosen as finalists, and after competing against twelve other bands in an online competition, and then the top five groups in a "battle of the bands", they won.

On September 29, 2012, Stefania and the band played at the 17th-annual X96 Toyota "Big Ass Show" as one of nine bands, including Neon Trees, Imagine Dragons, Awolnation, Grouplove, The Used, The Wombats, Eve 6, and Dead Sara.

November 16, 2012 marked the release of the Summit Land Conservancy's 2nd Edition book, Summit County: Witness, which used a photograph taken by Barr as the cover image. The same photograph was also printed in Photographer's Forum "Best of High School and College Photography: 2012," earlier in the year, and accepted into the Springville Art Show, of Springville Utah, the previous year.

Recent work

Shrink the Giant recently won the "Best Alternative" UTA Award for their first album.

Shrink the Giant's  second album "Faceless" was released worldwide on December 4, 2014 in both digital download and CD format.

Filmography

See also
Deer Valley
Unrest (2006 film)
Right on Track
The Disney Channel

References

http://www.imdb.com/title/tt0453533/fullcredits - cast 
http://www.imdb.com/name/nm3271981/
https://web.archive.org/web/20110816162233/http://foursite.bside.com/2009/films/fiftycents_foursite2009;jsessionid=BABD3185DF21397573163831CB95A693

External links

1994 births
Living people
American women rock singers
American television actresses
American women composers
21st-century American composers
21st-century American actresses
American film actresses
Actresses from Salt Lake City
Musicians from Salt Lake City
21st-century American women singers
21st-century women composers